The 1983 Indiana Hoosiers men's soccer team represented Indiana University Bloomington during the 1983 NCAA Division I men's soccer season. The Hoosiers played their home matches at Bill Armstrong Stadium and were coached by 11th-year head coach, Jerry Yeagley. 

Indiana finished the season with a 21–1–4 record and won the NCAA National Championship, successfully defending their 1982 title. It was their second ever men's soccer title at the time.

Schedule 

|-
!colspan=6 style=""| Regular season

|-
!colspan=6 style=""| Big Ten Championship
|-

|}

References

External links 
 1983 Indiana Hoosiers Men's Soccer Schedule

1983
Indiana Hoosiers men's soccer
1983
1983